Graham Warwick Charles House (born 4 September 1950) is a former Australian cricketer who played domestically for both Western Australia and South Australia during the early 1970s. Born in Busselton, a mid-sized town in the south-west region of Western Australia, House was a talented schoolboy cricketer, captaining a representative Australian Schools team on a tour to India during the 1966–67 season. He made his debut at state level during the 1972–73 season, having previously also played for a Western Australia Country team against the touring English cricket team. House made his first-class debut in that season's Sheffield Shield, in a match against Victoria at the WACA Ground. A leg-spinner and competent lower-order batsman, he and Paul Nicholls worked in tandem as Western Australia's spinners during the match. House took only one wicket in the match (that of Graham Yallop in Victoria's second innings), but in Western Australia's second innings he scored 70 not out, his highest first-class score and only half-century. He and Jim Hubble put on an unbeaten partnership of 87 runs for the eighth wicket to secure victory by three wickets.

House played a further three matches for Western Australia (two during the rest of the 1972–73 season and one the following season), but Bob Paulsen was generally the state's first-choice spinner, and he transferred to South Australia for the following season. Though hoping to gain more regular selection, he only played twice at first-class level for South Australia—once against Queensland and once against England on its 1974–75 tour of Australia. Returning to Busselton, House occasionally played Australian rules football in the local South West Football League (SWFL), and won the Busselton Football Club's best and fairest award in 1976. After retiring from playing, House served in various coaching and administrative roles in the Northern Territory, including head coach of the Northern Territory Institute of Sport's cricket program and chairman of selectors of Northern Territory Cricket.

References

1950 births
Australian cricket administrators
Australian cricket coaches
Australian cricketers
Australian rules footballers from Western Australia
Busselton Football Club players
Cricketers from Western Australia
Living people
People from Busselton
South Australia cricketers
Western Australia cricketers